Luis Arturo Peralta Ariño (born July 30, 1992) is a Colombian professional footballer who plays for Salvadoran club FAS.

Honours

Club 
FAS
Salvadoran Primera División: Clausura 2021

References

External links
Luis Arturo Peralta at ZeroZero
 

1992 births
Living people
Colombian footballers
Colombian expatriate footballers
Deportes Tolima footballers
Club de Gimnasia y Esgrima La Plata footballers
Gimnasia y Esgrima de Jujuy footballers
Once Caldas footballers
Expatriate footballers in Argentina
Bangu Atlético Clube players
Monagas S.C. players
Sport Boys footballers
Association football forwards
People from La Guajira Department